Six ships and a shore establishment of the Royal Navy have borne the name HMS Actaeon or HMS Acteon, after Actaeon, a figure in Greek mythology:

  was a 28-gun sixth-rate frigate launched in 1757 and sold as unserviceable in 1766.
  was a 28-gun sixth-rate frigate launched in 1775 and grounded and burnt in 1776.
  was a 44-gun fifth-rate two-decker launched in 1778, on harbour service from 1795 and sold in 1802.
  was the 16-gun French brig Actêon that  captured in 1805 off Rochefort; Acteon was broken up in 1816.
  was a 26-gun sixth rate launched in 1831. She was converted to a survey ship in 1856, lent to the Cork Harbour Board in 1870 as a hulk, and sold in 1889.
 HMS Actaeon was a hulk, originally the 50-gun fourth rate  that formed part of the Navy's torpedo school, . She was renamed HMS Actaeon in 1886 and was sold in 1923.
  was a modified  sloop launched in 1945 and sold to West Germany in 1959 as Hipper. She was hulked in 1964 and sold for breaking up in 1967.
It was established as a separate command in 1905 and paid off in 1922.
 was the original HMS Actaeon, renamed and commissioned in 1905 and sold in 1922.
 was HMS Actaeon II between 1906 and 1922.

References

Royal Navy ship names